Adam Thomas (born 1988) is an English actor.

Adam Thomas may also refer to:

 Adam Thomas (rugby union) (born 1986), Welsh rugby union player
 Adam Thomas (footballer) (born 1992), New Zealand footballer

See also